Stigmella progonopis is a moth of the family Nepticulidae. It is found in New Zealand.

The length of the forewings is about 3 mm. Adults have been recorded in January and February. There is one generation per year.

The larvae feed on Dracophyllum traversii, Dracophyllum longifolium, Dracophyllum menziesii and Gaultheria crassa. They mine the leaves of their host plant. The mine consists of a long, linear gallery originating near the leaf-base. When the larva reaches the apex of the leaf it crosses a leaf rib and eats its way back towards the egg site. Each mine is visible as a brown streak and often there are several mines on one leaf. Larva have been recorded from April to August. They are 3–4 mm and pale yellow.

The cocoon consists of brown silk and is spun between the tightly packed petioles of older leaves on the shoot.

References

External links
Fauna of New Zealand - Number 16: Nepticulidae (Insecta: Lepidoptera)

Nepticulidae
Moths of New Zealand
Endemic fauna of New Zealand
Moths described in 1921
Taxa named by Edward Meyrick
Endemic moths of New Zealand